This is a list of rivers and creeks located on the island of Prince Edward Island.

Despite the fact that many are called rivers, their freshwater portions are not large enough to warrant this name. These watercourses are more correctly categorized as streams, with the majority of their length being tidal inlets or estuaries where the small amount of fresh water interchanges with salt water from the Gulf of St. Lawrence or Northumberland Strait.

Atlantic watershed
Gulf of Saint Lawrence watershed
Anderson River
Cat River
Barbara River
Battis River
Bear River
Beatons River
Bedeque River
Belle River
Bentick River
Bideford River
Big Pierre Jacques River
Black River
Brudenell River
Boughton River
Bradshaw River
Brae River
Brooks River
Cape Traverse River
Cardigan River
Cow River
Crooked River
Cross River
Desable River
Dirty River
Dock River
Dunk River
Enmore River
Flat River
Fortune River
Fox River
Foxley River
French River
George river
Goodwood River
Goose River
Grand River
Greek River
Haldiman River
Hay River
Hills River
Hillsborough (East) River
Johnstons River
Pisquid River
Glenfinnan River
Hollow River
Hope River
Hunter River
Huntley River
Indian River
Jacques River
Kildare River
Little Pierre Jacques River
Long River
MacDonalds River
Marie River
Mary River
McAskill River
Midgell River
Mill River
Miminegash River
Mink River
Mitchell River
Montague River
Montrose River
Morell River
Murray River
Naufrage River
Newtown River
North (Yorke) River
Oak River
Orwell River
Ox River
Oyster River
Percival River
Pinette River
Platte River
Portage River
Seal River
Sheep River
Shipyard River
Smelt River
Souris River
Southwest River
St. Peters River
Stanley River
Founds River
Sturgeon River
Tignish River
Trout River
Tryon River
Valleyfield River
Vernon River
West (Elliot) River
Clyde River
Westmoreland River
Wheatley River
Wilmot River
Winter River, source of drinking water for Charlottetown

See also 
List of rivers of Canada

Rivers
Prince Edward Island